Puras de Villafranca, also known as Puras, is a village in the municipality of Belorado (Burgos, Spain) in the region of Montes de Oca, with historical links to Villafranca Montes de Oca.

Nearby is located the Fuentemolinos cave.

Populated places in the Province of Burgos